The 1978 Atlantic Coast Conference men's basketball tournament was held in Greensboro, North Carolina, at the Greensboro Coliseum from March 1–4. Duke defeated , 85–77, to win the championship. Jim Spanarkel of Duke was named the tournament MVP.

Bracket

References

Tournament
ACC men's basketball tournament
College sports tournaments in North Carolina
Basketball competitions in Greensboro, North Carolina
ACC men's basketball tournament
ACC men's basketball tournament